The Mahiya or Maiya are a landowning community found in the state of Gujarat in India.

History and origin 
The community claim to have been settled along the banks of the Mahi river in Kheda District, so they came to be known as Maiya. The community settled in Gujarat during the rule of Sultan Mahmud Begada, and moved into Saurashtra in the 16th Century. There they established states in Wankaner and the small states of Kuwadva and Than near Rajkot. A section of the some cast Maiya converted to Islam, and are now known as the Miyana. and other rajput cast covert known as MAHIYA now they are staying in junagadh District. They rebelled against the Nawab of Junagadh in 1882, and were suppressed. As a result of the rebellion, they lost much of their land.

See also
Kota Brahmins
Mers
Kathi
Manka
Thakore

References

 

Social groups of Gujarat
Indian castes